Pyroblazer is a futuristic combat racing game developed by Eipix Entertainment for Microsoft Windows. The game is published by Candella Software. The game was released on Steam, Gamersgate, and Direct2Drive on November 13, 2008.

Gameplay
In Pyroblazer, players take control of futuristic anti-gravity combat craft called Blazers and pilot them against each other across the lands of a world known as New Aperion. Players attack other players by collecting weapon and ammo upgrades throughout a race, and new, more powerful Blazers can be unlocked as a player wins the single-player Championship mode.

Multiplayer
Aside from the single-player modes, six-person local multiplayer would also be featured in Pyroblazer, as well as an online multiplayer mode.

However, the multiplayer component of Pyroblazer was later removed due to funding.

Playable Demo
On November 24, 2008, an exclusive playable demo was released to the Total Gaming Network. The demo features two different levels: Wastelands of Aperion (Daytime) and Fusion Sphere (Nighttime). Along with these two levels, gamers can choose from four different Blazers to race and shoot their way through the courses.

References

 Večernje novosti: I za igre treba para

External links
PyroBlazer Official Website
Eipix Main Website
Pyroblazer Demo

2008 video games
Video games developed in Serbia
Cancelled Wii games
Cancelled PlayStation Portable games
Science fiction racing games
Vehicular combat games
Windows games
Windows-only games
Single-player video games
CI Games games